Testis-expressed protein 14 is a protein in humans encoded by the TEX14 gene, and is 1497 amino acids in length. TEX14 plays a vital role in the formation of germ cells, as it is an essential component of the mammalian germ cell interphase bridge.

An orthologue of TEX14 exists in other mammals, also called TEX14.

Function 
During cell division, specifically in telophase, the spindle is converted into a midbody. This midbody contains a ring of TEX14, which gradually travels outwards as cell division progresses. Finally, TEX14 marks the ends of the intercellular bridge.

Clinical significance 

Male mice and male pigs that lack normal TEX14 are incapable of producing functional sperm, and thus are infertile. However, TEX14-knockout female mice are not infertile.

References 

Molecular biology
Genes on human chromosome 17
Human genes